Montanaro  is a municipality in the Metropolitan City of Turin in the Italian region Piedmont.

Montanaro  may also refer to:

 Montanaro (surname), an Italian surname
 Montanaro (grape), an Italian wine grape

See also 
 Montanari (disambiguation)